Andreas Savva (born 21 July 2004) is a Cypriot footballer who plays as an attacking midfielder for Omonia.

Education
Andreas Savva currently attends high school in his home town of Nicosia.

Honours
Omonia
 Cypriot Cup: 2021–22
 Cypriot Super Cup: 2021

References

External links

2004 births
Living people
Cypriot footballers
Association football midfielders
AC Omonia players
Cyprus youth international footballers